Patrick Fitzgerald (16 December 1881 – 26 June 1970) was an Irish hurler. His championship career with the Tipperary senior team lasted from 1908 until 1910, during which time he won one All-Ireland Championship medal.

Honours

Tipperary
All-Ireland Senior Hurling Championship (1): 1908
Munster Senior Hurling Championship (2): 1908, 1909

References

1881 births
1970 deaths
Gortnahoe-Glengoole hurlers
Tipperary inter-county hurlers
All-Ireland Senior Hurling Championship winners